Gem-associated protein 4 is a protein that in humans is encoded by the GEMIN4 gene.

Function 

The product of this gene is part of the SMN protein complex localized to the cytoplasm, nucleoli, and to discrete nuclear bodies called Gemini bodies (gems). The complex functions in spliceosomal snRNP assembly in the cytoplasm, and regenerates spliceosomes required for pre-mRNA splicing in the nucleus. The encoded protein directly interacts with a DEAD box protein and several spliceosome core proteins. Alternatively spliced transcript variants have been described, but their biological validity has not been determined.

Interactions

GEMIN4 has been shown to interact with:
 DDX20, 
 EIF2C2, 
 LGALS1  and
 SMN1.

References

Further reading